Doris Lorenz-Müller (25 February 1935 – 25 February 2013) was a German athlete. She competed in the women's discus throw at the 1960 Summer Olympics and the 1964 Summer Olympics.

References

1935 births
2013 deaths
Athletes (track and field) at the 1960 Summer Olympics
Athletes (track and field) at the 1964 Summer Olympics
German female discus throwers
Olympic athletes of the United Team of Germany
Place of birth missing